The 2012–13 Romanian Hockey League season was the 83rd season of the Romanian Hockey League, the top level of ice hockey in Romania. Seven teams participated in the league, and HSC Csíkszereda won the championship.

First round

Qualification round

Playoffs

Semifinals 
HSC Csíkszereda - HSC Csíkszereda II 1:0 (12:0) 
SCM Fenestela 68 Brașov - Steaua Rangers 3:0 (3:2 OT, 7:0, 3:2)

3rd place game 
Steaua Rangers - HSC Csíkszereda II 3:0 (6:1, 6:2, 7:1)

Final 
HSC Csíkszereda - SCM Fenestela 68 Brașov 4:1 (6:2, 2:4, 6:2, 4:1, 6:4)

External links 
 Romanian Ice Hockey Federation

Rom
Romanian Hockey League seasons
Rom